XHCTC-FM is a radio station on 99.9 FM in Ciudad Cuauhtémoc, Chihuahua, Mexico. The station is owned by Multimedios Radio and known as La Caliente with a regional Mexican format.

History
XHCTC received its concession on June 7, 1990. It was originally owned by Enrique Regules Uriegas.

In 2019, the station was approved to reduce its effective radiated power to 30 kW.

References

Radio stations in Chihuahua
Multimedios Radio